WDDK (103.9 FM) is a radio station broadcasting a Conservative Talk/Oldies format. Licensed to Greensboro, Georgia, United States, the station is currently owned by Wyche Services Corporation and features programming from ABC Radio .

History
The station went on the air as WGRG on 1980-07-21. On 1990-04-13, the station changed its call sign to the current WDDK.

References

External links
Official Website

DDK
Oldies radio stations in the United States
Talk radio stations in the United States
Radio stations established in 1980
1980 establishments in Georgia (U.S. state)